Pritelivir (BAY 57-1293) is an antiviral helicase-primase complex inhibitor.  Pritelivir is currently tested in phase 3 clinical trials as an antiviral for Herpes Simplex.

References

Antiviral drugs
2-Pyridyl compounds
Sulfonamides
Thiazoles
Acetamides